Todd Bowie (born October 5, 1965) is an American rock guitarist and technician who has played and toured with various bands during the 1990s and 2000s.

Career

Band support staff
A former touring guitar technician and assistant to the Eagles, Joe Walsh, Glenn Frey, Don Henley, Fleetwood Mac, Beck, The Flaming Lips and others during the 1990s and early 2000s, Todd retired from touring after serving as Beck's keyboard technician on the 2002-2003 "Sea Change" tour. He was credited on the Eagles "Hell Freezes Over" album, as well as Fleetwood Mac "The Dance", C.S.N.Y. "Looking Forward", and Joe Walsh "Look What I Did: The Joe Walsh Anthology". Todd also assisted Joe Walsh on the 1998 Ringo Starr release "Vertical Man", and Ringo's 1998 appearance on VH-1 "Storytellers".

Artist
Bowie was a guitarist for the New Hampshire group Toiz in the 1980s. He was the debut artist for Machine Records (a Chicago area indie label), recording his debut solo album "Lucky Space People" in 2005. He also produced other projects for the Machine label, including the Sundayrunners debut album "First Game Of The Season", and was co-producer of Martha Berner's "This Side Of Yesterday".

Bowie fronted the duo band The Karlz (written the karlz) with Doug Corella from 2004-2018.

See also
Guitar technician

References

External links
Todd Bowie's homepage
Uncommon Ground artist profile
Thekarlz.com

Road crew
American rock guitarists
American male guitarists
Living people
1965 births